Peter Ryefelt (8 September 1893 – 10 February 1967) was a Danish fencer. He competed at two Olympic Games.

References

External links
 

1893 births
1967 deaths
Danish male fencers
Olympic fencers of Denmark
Fencers at the 1924 Summer Olympics
Fencers at the 1928 Summer Olympics
Sportspeople from Region Zealand